Milan Tepić (26 January 1957 – 29 September 1991) was a major in the Yugoslav People's Army during the Croatian War of Independence.

In September 1991, Tepić was tasked with defending an ammunition storage in the village of  Hrgovljani just outside Bjelovar. After the defeat of the city's defenders in the Siege of Bjelovar Barracks, Tepić ordered the evacuation of the storage facility while staying behind himself. He then detonated an explosive charge to prevent the capture of the stored ammunition, weapons, and other equipment, killing himself in the process.

Aftermath 

Major Milan Tepić was declared a National Hero of Yugoslavia. He was the last person that received this title. In Croatia he is perceived as a war criminal who almost destroyed the town of Bjelovar.

Streets in Belgrade, Banja Luka, Kozarska Dubica Vršac, Zrenjanin, and Sremska Mitrovica are named after him. There is also a monument of Milan Tepić in his street in Belgrade. One street in Novi Sad was also named after him until being changed in 2004. In Republika Srpska the Medal of Major Milan Tepić awarded for bravery is named after him.

See also 
 Stevan Sinđelić, who did a similar act almost 200 years before during the First Serbian Uprising.

References

External links 
 

1957 births
1991 deaths
People from Dubica, Bosnia and Herzegovina
Serbs of Bosnia and Herzegovina
Serbian soldiers
Recipients of the Order of the People's Hero
Officers of the Yugoslav People's Army
Military personnel of the Croatian War of Independence
Military personnel killed in the Croatian War of Independence
Yugoslav military personnel killed in action